Synapse.org is an open source platform for collaborative scientific data analysis. It can store data, code, results, and descriptions research work. It is operated by nonprofit organization Sage Bionetworks.

The Synapse web portal is an online registry of research projects that allows data scientists to discover and share data, models, and analysis methods.

References

Open science
Collaborative projects
Computing websites
Cross-platform software
Project hosting websites